Kashmir gold is a type of granite found in Madurai, Tamil Nadu state, India. This is a yellow coloured granite, with black granules in its structure.

The Kashmir gold granite is only a trade name of this granite, such as Kashmir white granite is. Neither are found in the Kashmir region, however the familiar trade names are popular. People often tout Kashmir granite as a selling feature in expensive homes.

Kashmir
Large deposits of granite, limestone and marble are found in parts of India. The two main Kashmir granite types are gold and white.

References

Granite
Building stone
Mining in Tamil Nadu